John Marshall Gorham (25 November 1853 - 12 January 1929) was a British motorboat racer who competed in the 1908 Summer Olympics.

Career
He was educated at Tonbridge School, and served an apprenticeship of four years (1870-1874) to Messrs. Robey & Co. Engineers, Lincoln passing through the shops and drawing office; then for 6 years was Engineering Assistant to the same firm engaged on installations of Mining Machinery principally in England, Spain and France; for 1 year (1881) represented Messrs. Robey at the Paris Electrical Exhibition; and for two years (1882-1883) on electrical installations at the Palaces of the King of Roumania. Between 1884-1886 acted as Works Manager to the Electrical Power Storage Company; and since 1886 has been in partnership with Mr B. Drake under the style of Drake and Gorham. The firm have a turnover of £150,000 and are principally engaged as Electrical Engineers in connection with the lighting of country houses, Offices and Public buildings such as Chatsworth, Wynard Park, Crewe Hall, the Prudential Insurance Co.'s offices, Scotland Yard Government contract £9000 etc.

Family
He was the son of Dr John Gorham (1814-1899), a general practitioner of Tonbridge, Kent, and his second wife Elizabeth née Harris (1829-1916). In 1906 he married Sophia Hope Hallowes, a daughter of Major-General George Skene Hallowes (1831-1940) and Lucy Ann, née Hope (1846-1931); her sister, Elizabeth Boyle Hallowes, married David Carnegie, 10th Earl of Northesk.

References

Sources
 CIBSE Heritage Group: Biographies of Bernard Drake and his son
 Grace's Guide: Drake_and_Gorham outline history

1853 births
1929 deaths
People educated at Tonbridge School
British motorboat racers
Olympic motorboat racers of Great Britain
Motorboat racers at the 1908 Summer Olympics